Cianopramine (INN) (developmental code name Ro 11-2465), also known as 3-cyanoimipramine, is a tricyclic antidepressant related to imipramine that acts as a serotonin reuptake inhibitor and weak serotonin receptor antagonist. It was investigated for the treatment of depression but was never marketed.

See also 
 Clomipramine
 Cyanodothiepin
 Cyamemazine

References 

Dibenzazepines
Nitriles
Tricyclic antidepressants
Selective serotonin reuptake inhibitors
Serotonin receptor antagonists